Glorianda Cipolla (born 2 October 1946) is an Italian former alpine skier who competed in the 1968 Winter Olympics.

References

External links
 

1946 births
Living people
Italian female alpine skiers
Olympic alpine skiers of Italy
Alpine skiers at the 1968 Winter Olympics
People from Courmayeur
Sportspeople from Aosta Valley